Şcheia may refer to several places in Romania:

 Şcheia, a commune in Iași County
 Şcheia, a commune in Suceava County
 Șcheia River, a tributary of the Suceava River
 Şcheia, a village in Alexandru Ioan Cuza commune, Iași County